The Hampton Falls River is a  river in southeastern New Hampshire in the United States. Its lower reaches are tidal, as part of the Hampton salt marsh close to the Atlantic Ocean.

The river rises in the southeast corner of Kensington and travels east into Seabrook. The river approximately follows the boundary between Seabrook and Hampton Falls, crossing it three times. It passes Weares Mill and eventually heads northeast into Hampton Falls. Approaching the town center, it passes through the chain of three Dodge Ponds, dropping  over the "Hampton Falls" before entering the final one. Crossing under U.S. Route 1, the river enters the Hampton salt marsh, where it ends at the Hampton River.

See also

List of rivers of New Hampshire

References

Rivers of New Hampshire
Rivers of Rockingham County, New Hampshire